Gigantosaurus is a dubious genus of sauropod dinosaur from the Late Jurassic Kimmeridge Clay Formation of England. The type species, Gigantosaurus megalonyx, was named and described by Harry Govier Seeley in 1869. Its syntype series consists of several separately discovered sauropod bones found in Cambridgeshire, including two caudal (tail) vertebrae (CAMSM J.29477 and CAMSM J.29478), the distal end of a tibia (CAMSM J.29483), a cast of the right radius (CAMSM J.29482), a cast of phalanx (CAMSM J.29479) and an osteoderm (CAMSM J.29481). It was synonymised to Ornithopsis humerocristatus by Richard Lydekker in 1888 and to Pelorosaurus by Friedrich von Huene in 1909. Today it is considered a nomen dubium. 
 
Because of these references Eberhard Fraas incorrectly assumed in 1908 the name was available for other species and he used it, despite it being preoccupied, for African material totally unrelated to the British finds. As a result, the name Gigantosaurus factored into the convoluted taxonomic history of the African dinosaurs Barosaurus, Tornieria, and Janenschia. A discussion of this can be found in the main Tornieria article.

References

Sauropods
Kimmeridgian life
Late Jurassic dinosaurs of Europe
Jurassic England
Fossils of England
Fossil taxa described in 1869
Taxa named by Harry Seeley
Nomina dubia